Springfield Township is one of the nine townships of Summit County, Ohio, United States.  The population as of 2018 is 14,555 residents.

Geography
Located in the southeastern part of the county, it borders the following townships and cities:
Tallmadge - north
Brimfield Township, Portage County - northeast corner
Suffield Township, Portage County - east
Lake Township - southeast
Green - south
Coventry Township - west
Akron - northwest

Several municipalities are located in the original boundaries of Springfield Township:
Part of the city of Akron, the county seat of Summit County, in the northwest
Part of the village of Mogadore, in the northeast
The village of Lakemore, in the center

Name and history
It is one of eleven Springfield Townships statewide. It was part of the Connecticut Western Reserve. It is named after the Connecticut River Valley city of Springfield, Massachusetts.

Government
The township is governed by a three-member board of trustees, who are elected in November of odd-numbered years to a four-year term beginning on the following January 1. Two are elected in the year after the presidential election and one is elected in the year before it. There is also an elected township fiscal officer, who serves a four-year term beginning on April 1 of the year after the election, which is held in November of the year before the presidential election. Vacancies in the fiscal officership or on the board of trustees are filled by the remaining trustees.  Current trustees are Kellie Chapman, Joe DiLauro, and Dean Young, the fiscal officer is Michael Spickard and Parks and Special Projects Coordinator is Terry Robinson
.

Education
Springfield Local School District encompasses Springfield Township and the village of Lakemore. Portage Lakes Career Center is the vocational school for Springfield. (Summit County Fiscal Officer, 2005) The school district has faced serious financial difficulty; at the current time, the district's student transportation is at state minimum, and the district is actively cutting staff.

Springfield's original high school had been annexed by Akron in 1929, requiring construction of the older building of the former high school which was replaced in 2014 in the same location. The original building became part of Akron Public Schools, at first Ellet High School, and later Ritzman Elementary. That building was also recently demolished, and a new school was built upon its site.

Notable residents
Art Arfons, land speed record holder
Walt Arfons, land speed record holder and half brother of Art Arfons
Ernest Angley, Christian evangelist

See also
Springfield High School (Lakemore, Ohio)

References

Further reading

The Ohio State University Department of Human and Community Resource Development (2003). Summit County. Retrieved April 29, 2005.
Springfield Township, Summit County, Ohio (2003-2004). Springfield Township about us. Retrieved April 29, 2005.
Summit County Fiscal Officer, John Donofrio (2005). TAX YEAR 2004/COLLECTION YEAR 2005 FULL TAX RATE SUMMARY SHEET. Retrieved April 29, 2005.

External links
Township website
County website
School district website

Townships in Summit County, Ohio
Townships in Ohio
English-American culture in Ohio
Urban townships in Ohio